Islington St Mary's Football Club was a football club based in north London, England.

History
Originally founded in 1978 as a youth team, the club won a number of local cups in the late 1980s and early 1990s. In 1993, under the name of Walthamstow St Mary's, following a merger with Walthamstow Trojans in 1991, the club joined the Spartan League Division Two. In 1995, following promotion to Division One, the club changed name to Islington St Mary's. In 1996, Islington St Mary's won promotion to the Spartan League Premier Division. In 1997–98, the club was placed into the Spartan South Midlands League Premier Division South, following a merger between the Spartan League and the South Midlands League. The club's final season in senior football came in the 1998–99 season, entering the FA Vase for the first time.

Ground
Upon the dissolving of the club, the club played at Coles Park in Tottenham.

Records
Best FA Vase performance: First round, 1998–99

References

External links

Defunct football clubs in England
Spartan League
Spartan South Midlands Football League
Association football clubs established in 1978
1978 establishments in England
Association football clubs disestablished in 1999
Defunct football clubs in London
1999 disestablishments in England
Sport in the London Borough of Islington
Sport in the London Borough of Haringey